Bo Jimmy Thelin (born 14 March 1978) is a Swedish football manager and former player. He is the manager of IF Elfsborg in Allsvenskan.

He is the older brother of Tommy Thelin, forward and captain of Jönköpings Södra.

Playing career 
He played until 2003 as a centre-back for IF Hagapojkarna (now renamed IF Haga), one of the local minor teams of the city of Jönköping, in the fourth and in the fifth level in the league system of Swedish football.

Managerial career 
He began his coaching career taking over as FC Ljungarum coach in 2005. This newly founded team had its first effective season in 2006, dominating the Division 6 championship with 17 wins out of 18 games total.

Thelin remained at FC Ljungarum until 2008, winning another championship. In 2009, he started managing the Jönköpings Södra Under-17 team, before coaching the Under-19 and the Under-21 teams of the same club.

At the beginning of the 2014 season, the previous Jönköpings Södra coach Mats Gren moved to the role of sporting director for IFK Göteborg, so the team found itself without a manager when 2014 Superettan had already started. The board decided to promote Jimmy Thelin as a head coach of the first team, finishing the season in 4th place (the club's best finish since 1976). In the following season he achieved an even better result, leading J-Södra back to the Allsvenskan after 46 years since the last time.

Honours

Manager
Jönköpings Södra
Superettan: 2015

References

1978 births
Swedish footballers
Swedish football managers
People from Jönköping Municipality
Jönköpings Södra IF managers
Living people
Association football fullbacks
Sportspeople from Jönköping County